Ed Warren, born Ed Warren Leisenring, ( 1886/1887April 15, 1963) was an American actor and politician who served as the 35th and 41st Mayor of Cheyenne, Wyoming.

Early life

Ed Warren Leisenring was born around 1886 or 1887. He became an actor as a child with his two sisters after being introduced by Fred Stone. He later adopted the stage name of Ed Warren as he felt that his last name "Leisenring" was too complicated. His career as an actor ended shortly after 1915 as by that time both of his sisters had left due to getting married. During his career he played on Broadway and would later become the third mayor of Cheyenne, Wyoming to have done so.

Career

City council

In 1933, he placed fourth out of sixteen candidates, behind Arthur B. Henderson, Arthur W. Trout, and E. J. Smalley, in the Cheyenne city council primary. In the general election he and Trout defeated Henderson and Smalley. Warren and Trout were reelected in 1935 and 1937.

On June 18, 1938, he offered a $25 reward for information leading to the arrest of vandals who attempted to blow up a wooden building in Kiwanis Beach park using a powder keg with a fifty-foot fuse.

Mayor

In 1939, he ran in the Cheyenne mayoral primary and placed in the top two alongside John J. McInerney ahead of nine other candidates. In the general election he easily defeated McInerney. In 1941, he won reelection against McInerney. On August 12, 1943, he announced that he would seek reelection, but placed last in the mayoral primary.

On March 1, 1951, Mayor Benjamin Nelson resigned from office after he was called to active duty in the air force. Edward Gowdy took over as acting mayor and he and A. W. Trout selected Warren to serve out the remainder of Nelson's term. On June 21, Warren was sworn in as mayor.

Warren announced that he would seek election to a term in his own right and placed first out of ten candidates in the mayoral primary. However, in the general election he was defeated by R. E. Cheever.

Later life

In 1952, state Senator George E. Lindell resigned to become an instructor at Francis E. Warren Air Force Base. Warren, Art Buck, and Raymond Morris were nominated by the Laramie County Democratic Central Committee. Warren was selected on January 25, and served until the term expired on January 1, 1953.

On September 15, 1953, he announced that he would run in Cheyenne's mayoral primary. However, he came behind incumbent Mayor Cheever and Val S. Christensen.

In October 1955, he announced that he would run in Cheyenne's mayoral primary against incumbent Mayor Christensen and former Mayor Cheever. In the primary he placed third and endorsed Cheever for the general election. In the general election Christensen defeated Cheever.

On April 14, 1963, Warren asked Ed Piva to dig a hole in his yard so that a tree could be planted. On April 15, he committed suicide with his dog by inhaling carbon monoxide from his car exhaust. He left a letter asking for his dog to be buried in the hole dug by Piva.

Electoral history

References

External links

1880s births
1963 suicides
20th-century American politicians
Mayors of Cheyenne, Wyoming
Wyoming city council members
Democratic Party Wyoming state senators
American politicians who committed suicide